The 2012 season is the 91st season in El Salvador's history, their 74th in FIFA and 50th in CONCACAF. As of December 2012, the team was managed by Agustín Castillo. In mid-June, Rubén Israel quit due to financial problems between him and the Federation. FESFUT then hired a new coach 14 July 2012. The new DT, Juan de Dios Castillo, would coach until the end of the 2013 after the 2013 Copa Centroamericana and 2013 Gold Cup. Although, the elimination of La Selecta for the campaign for the 2014 World Cup led the FESFUT to fire him due to the poor result. By 18 December 2012, FESFUT had hired Agustín Castillo for the new DT. He became the first Peruvian to coach the national team.

Players
These players have been capped during the 2012 season (listed alphabetically):
name (games played)

 Dennis Alas (8)
 Jaime Alas (6)
 Christian Bautista (1)
 Léster Blanco (6)
 Nelson Bonilla (5)
 Rafael Burgos (6)
 Darwin Cerén (2)
 Christian Castillo (2)
 Elder Figueroa (6)
 Andrés Flores(1)

 Xavier García (7)
 Isidro Gutiérrez (4)
 José Henríquez (1)
 Alexander Larín (2)
 Alexander Méndoza (2)
 Carlos Monteagudo (4)
 Milton Molina (3)
 Alfredo Pacheco (7)
 Dagoberto Portillo (2)

 Steve Purdy (6)
 Eliseo Quintanilla (8)
 Osael Romero (7)
 Edwin Sánchez (1)
 Ramón Sánchez (8)
 Herbert Sosa (2)
 Víctor Turcios (6)
 Ricardo Ulloa (3)
 Benji Villalobos (5)

Debutants
 Eldel Figueroa – On February 29, started in a friendly math against Estonia
 Alexander Méndoza – On February 29, came on as a substitute in a friendly match against Estonia
 Nelson Bonilla – On May 23, started in a friendly match against New Zealand
 Ricardo Ulloa – On May 23, came on as a substitute in a friendly match against New Zealand
 Darwin Cerén – on May 23, came on as a substitute in a friendly match against New Zealand
 Isidro Gutiérrez – on June 2, came on as a substitute in a friendly match against Honduras
 Alexander Larín – on August 11, started in a friendly math against Guatemala

Player statistics

Goal scorers

Goal assists

Bookings

Competitions

Overall

Results summary

Friendly

2014 World Cup qualifiers

Third round

Coaching staff

Ranking

References

2012
El
2011–12 in Salvadoran football
2012–13 in Salvadoran football